The British Speedway Promoters Limited (BSPL) organises the domestic motorcycle speedway competitions in the United Kingdom. They are also responsible for the promotion and running of the FIM meetings staged in Britain. 

Each club has a promoter in the association, although promotions under three years of membership do not have a vote. A Management Committee is elected at the Annual General Meeting, and this committee is responsible for the day-to-day running of British speedway.

All the promoters meet periodically to discuss matters of importance, usually rule changes.

See also
Motorcycle speedway
The Speedway Control Bureau
Elite League
Premier League
Conference League
British Speedway Championship
Speedway in the United Kingdom

References

External links

Speedway in the United Kingdom
Speedway
Motorcycle racing organizations